Voipfone is a UK (London) based Internet Telephone Service (VoIP) provided by iNet Telecoms Ltd, which was founded in 2004 by Lee Rose. The company develops standards based, VoIP telephony services using Session Initiation Protocol (SIP). As of July 2014, the company has an annual turnover of over £4 million.

See also 
 List of VOIP companies

References

External links

VoIP companies of the United Kingdom